Juan Arnau (Valencia, April 28, 1968), Spanish philosopher and essayist, a specialist in Eastern philosophies and religions.

Biography 

After a few years working as a sailor and several trips to Africa, Juan Arnau studied Astrophysics at the Complutense University of Madrid, where he graduated in 1994.

He traveled to India in 1995, with a fellowship from the Spanish Agency for International Cooperation (AECI) and at the University of Varanasi (Banaras Hindu University, BHU), where he began his studies of Indian philosophy and culture with Catalan Sanskritist Oscar Pujol.

From India he went to Mexico, where he did his PhD at the Centre for Asian and African Studies at El Colegio de México, studying Sanskrit with Rashik Vihari Joshi.

After completing his PhD he moved to Ann Arbor (Michigan) for six years, where he did postdoctoral research at the Department of Asian Languages and Cultures of the University of Michigan, with Luis Ó. Gomez. Meanwhile he taught Spanish, and Latin American Literature and Cinema, in the Department of Romance Languages.

Currently a researcher at the Institute of History of Medicine and Science López Piñero (CSIC-University of Valencia) and associate professor at the University of Barcelona.

Bibliography

Critical editions 
Juan Arnau has made the critical editions, translated directly from Sanskrit, from the philosophical treatises of Nāgārjuna, as well as from the Bhagavad Gita and the Upanishads:
 Fundamentos de la vía media (2004). (Fundamentals of the Middle Way). Direct translation from Sanskrit. Madrid: Siruela. .
 Abandono de la discusión (2006). (Leaving discussion). Direct translation from Sanskrit. Madrid: Siruela. .
 Bhagavadgītā (2016). Atalanta. .
 Upaniṣad. Correspondencias ocultas (2019). Atalanta. .

He has also translated:
 Henryk Skolimowski, La mente participativa. Una nueva teoría del universo y del conocimiento (2016). Atalanta. .

Philosophical fictions 
 El cristal Spinoza (2012). (The Crystal Spinoza). Pre-Textos. .
 El efecto Berkeley (2015). Valencia: Pre-Textos. .
 El sueño de Leibniz (2019). Valencia: Pre-Textos. .

Essays 
 El Mulamadhyamakakarikah de Nagarjuna: la vacuidad como medio hábil (2002). Tesis doctoral. Colegio de México, Centro de Estudios de Asia y África.
 Actualidad del pensamiento de Nagarjuna (2005). Colegio de México, Centro de Estudios de Asia y África.
 La palabra frente al vacío. Filosofía de Nagarjuna (2005). (Language against Emptiness. Philosophy of Nagarjuna). México D.F.: Fondo de Cultura Económica. .
 Antropología del budismo (2007). (Anthropology of Buddhism). Barcelona: Kairós. .
 Arte de probar. Ironía y lógica en India antigua (2008). (Art of proving. Irony and logic in ancient India). Madrid: Fondo de Cultura Económica. .
 Rendir el sentido. Filosofía y traducción (2008). (Rendering sense. Philosophy and translation). Valencia: Pre-Textos. .
 Elogio del asombro. Conversaciones con Agustín Andreu (2010). (Praise of amazement. Conversations with Agustin Andreu). Valencia: Pre-Textos. .
 Vasubandhu / Berkeley (2011). With Carlos Mellizo. Valencia: Pre-Textos. .
 Leyenda de Buda (2011). (Legend of the Buddha). Alianza. .
 Cosmologías de India. Védica, samkhya y budista (2012). (Cosmologies of India. Vedic Samkhya and Buddhist). Fondo de Cultura Económica. .
 La medicina india. Según las fuentes del Ayurveda (2013). Kairós. .
 Manual de filosofía portátil (2014). Atalanta. .
 La invención de la libertad (2016). Atalanta. .
 Budismo esencial (2017). Alianza. .
 La fuga de Dios (2017). Atalanta. .
 Historia de la imaginación. Del antiguo Egipto al sueño de la Ciencia (2020). Espasa. .
 La mente diáfana. Historia del pensamiento indio (2021). Galaxia Gutenberg. .
 Rousseau o la hierba doncella (2022). Alianza Editorial. .
 En la mente del mundo. La aventura del deseo y la percepción (2022). Galaxia Gutenberg. .

Awards 
 XXXIV Premio de la Crítica Literaria Valenciana for his work Manual de filosofía portátil (Ediciones Atalanta, 2014).

References

External links 

 Official website

Spanish essayists
Spanish male writers
Writers from the Valencian Community
1968 births
Living people
Complutense University of Madrid alumni
21st-century Spanish philosophers
University of Michigan fellows
Male essayists
21st-century essayists
21st-century male writers